Joe Williams (1934 – March 26, 2022) was an American men's college basketball coach. He was the head coach at Jacksonville University from 1964 to 1970, Furman University from 1970 to 1978, and Florida State University from 1978 to 1986.

Career
Williams notably led Artis Gilmore and the Dolphins of Jacksonville University to the final game of the 1970 NCAA tournament, where they lost 80–69 to Sidney Wicks and the UCLA Bruins, coached by John Wooden.

During his eight-year tenure (1970-1978) at Furman, the Paladins made it to the NCAA Tournament five times (1970–71, 1972–73, 1973–74, 1974–75 and 1977–78); won the Southern Conference Tournament five times (1970–71, 1972–73, 1973–74, 1974–75 and 1977–78) and the regular-season SoCon title three times (1973–74, 1974–75 and 1976–77).

During his lifetime, Williams was one of only 25 head coaches to have led three different teams to the NCAA tournament. He is a 1994 inductee of the Jacksonville University athletic hall of fame, and a 1996 inductee of the Furman University Athletic Hall of Fame.

Personal life
Williams' son, Blake, was an assistant basketball coach at Furman University in 2010. A nephew, Brian Johnson, is an MLB pitcher. Williams died on March 26, 2022, from cancer at the age of 88.

See also
 List of NCAA Division I Men's Final Four appearances by coach

References

Date of birth missing
1930s births
2022 deaths 
American men's basketball coaches
Basketball coaches from Florida
Deaths from cancer in Mississippi
Florida State Seminoles men's basketball coaches
Furman Paladins men's basketball coaches
Jacksonville Dolphins men's basketball coaches
People from Cocoa Beach, Florida